Beastie  may refer to:

Entertainment
 Beastie (Alton Towers), a roller coaster previously located at Alton Towers in Staffordshire, England
 The Beastie (Kings Island), a previous name for the Woodstock Express roller coaster located at Kings Island in Mason, Ohio
 The Beastie (Wonderland Sydney), a roller coaster that previously existed at Wonderland Sydney in Australia
 The Beasties, a nickname for the hip hop musical group Beastie Boys
 Beastie, a female professional wrestler from the Gorgeous Ladies of Wrestling
 "Beastie", a song by Jethro Tull from Broadsword and the Beast

Fiction
 Beasties (film), a 1989 comedy horror film
 The Beasties (book), a 2010 children's book by Jenny Nimmo
 The Beasties (novel), a 1997 young-adult novel by William Sleator
 Beasties, a type of creature in the role-playing game Changeling: The Dreaming
 Beast Wars (Canadian title: Beasties), a Transformers toy line and animated television series

Other uses
 Beastie (mascot), the BSD Daemon, mascot of the BSD operating system
 The Beasties, a collective name for the alcopop brand Wee Beastie

See also
 Beast (disambiguation)
 The Beast (disambiguation)
 The Beastmaster, a 1982 sword and sorcery film